Camajapita is a town in the municipality of San Martín de Hidalgo in the state of Jalisco, Mexico. It has a population of 280 inhabitants. The town takes its name after the adjacent town of Camajapa, which lies on the municipality of Cocula, Jalisco.

References

External links
Camajapita at PueblosAmerica.com

Populated places in Jalisco